Acts of the Unspeakable is the third album by the American death metal band Autopsy. It was the only album to feature Josh Barohn on bass.

Track listing

Credits
Chris Reifert – vocals, drums 
Danny Coralles – guitar 
Eric Cutler – guitar 
Josh Barohn – bass guitar
 Recorded June, 1992 at 
 Produced by Autopsy
 Engineered by Bill Thompson
 Assistant Engineered by Malcolm Sherwood and Jeff Fogerty
 Painting and logo by Kent Mathieu

Autopsy (band) albums
1992 albums